Yamara López Carrazana (born 18 August 1990) is a Cuban retired footballer who played as a defender. She has been a member of the Cuba women's national team.

International career
López capped for Cuba at senior level during the 2010 CONCACAF Women's World Cup Qualifying qualification.

References

1990 births
Living people
Cuban women's footballers
Cuba women's international footballers
Women's association football defenders